Dariusz Świerczewski (22 February 1936 – 9 February 2005) was a Polish basketball player. He competed in the men's tournament at the 1960 Summer Olympics. He studied at the Poznań University of Technology.

References

External links
 

1936 births
2005 deaths
Polish men's basketball players
Olympic basketball players of Poland
Basketball players at the 1960 Summer Olympics
Sportspeople from Lublin
Lech Poznań (basketball) players